Robert William Lombard  (18 October 1895 – July 1972) was the first coloured Helper Apostle of the Old Apostolic Church of Africa and founder of the Non-White Old Apostolic Church, that was later renamed to the Reformed Old Apostolic Church.

Reference

1895 births
1972 deaths
South African clergy